The Brush Disposal Act of 1916,  was a federal legislative act of the United States.  It stipulated that private timber company purchasers of United States National Forest timber be required by the U.S. Secretary of Agriculture to deposit the estimated cost of brush and debris removal resulting from their cutting operations with a special fund at the U.S. Treasury which would remain available until expended.

1916 in the environment
1916 in American law
United States federal environmental legislation